Loor may refer to:

Loor, character from D. J. MacHale's Pendragon series
André Loor (born 1931), Dutch historian
Barbara de Loor (born 1974), Dutch speed skater
Ivan Loor (born 1955), Russian politician
Viljar Loor (1953–2011), Estonian volleyball player